University of Ladakh (UOL) or Ladakh University, is a public  university located in Indian Union territory of Ladakh.  It was established on 16 December 2018 by The University of Ladakh Act, 2018 (Governor Act No. LVI of 2018) of Government of Jammu and Kashmir. It is a cluster university comprising degree colleges of Leh, Kargil, Nubra Valley, Zanskar, Dras and Khalatse.

History

University of Ladakh had entered into Memorandum of Understanding(MoU) with Delhi University to promote scientific and academic collaboration between two Universities. The understanding will help in organising academic workshops,conferences, seminars and cultural exchanges of mutual interest, organising sporting events in mutual places and also exchange of expertise in revising the existing curricular topics so that they can meet the current demands of employment and industry.

University of Ladakh has got Dr Surinder Kumar Mehta as its Vice-Chancellor for a period of three years.

See also
Indian Astronomical Observatory
Students' Educational and Cultural Movement of Ladakh

References

External links
 

 
Education in Ladakh
2018 establishments in Ladakh